"Little Dark Age" is a song by American rock band MGMT. It was released as the lead single from their fourth studio album, Little Dark Age, on October 17, 2017, through Columbia Records. In an interview with Newsweek, Andrew VanWyngarden, the lead vocalist, guitar player and songwriter for the band stated that 1980s Soviet synth-pop was influential to the song.

Release 
Leading up to the song's release, the band made several posts on their social media hyping up the album and then upcoming single. On October 12, 2017, the band posted a video clip of the beginning instrumental of the song to their social media with the caption "#LittleDarkAge". "Little Dark Age" was released as a digital single on October 17 through Columbia Records. The song was released with an accompanying music video.

Artwork
The cover art for the single is taken directly from a work of Japanese manga artist Suehiro Maruo. In the text-bubble, the character states the following: "Oh, OK. It's bad to ask for something without offering something in return.  So I will show you some magic. No tricks here. I call this 'Discovery of Africa.'"

Critical reception
Little Dark Age received generally positive reviews from critics. Writing for Spin, Jeremy Gordon called the song "grim and playful". He said the song and video were "dark, but only a little, and the vibe feels appropriate for where they are now—older, and without office jobs, but recognizant of what's still gone wrong." In late 2020, it experienced a resurgence in popularity due to a viral TikTok trend where hundreds of thousands utilized the song.

Music video
The music video for "Little Dark Age", directed by David MacNutt and Nathaniel Axel, premiered on October 17, 2017. The video was considered out of character and surprisingly gothic for the band. Jeremy Gordon of Spin called the video "Dada-esque".
As of August 2022, the video has been viewed over 100 million times through the band's official Vevo account on YouTube.

Credits
 Andrew van Wyngarden – vocals, synthesizer, programming, producer 
 Ben Goldwasser – synthesizer, programming, producer 
 James Richardson – additional bass guitar 
 Patrick Wimberly – producer 
 Dave Fridmann – producer

Charts

Certifications

References

2017 singles
2017 songs
Columbia Records singles
MGMT songs
Song recordings produced by Patrick Wimberly
Songs written by Andrew VanWyngarden
Songs written by Benjamin Goldwasser
Internet memes introduced in 2020
Nationalism